Marta Yanci is a Spanish actress and voiceover artist, and former chef.

Early and personal life 
Born in San Sebastián, Spain in 1980, Suma Cum Laude title in European Law.

She is married and has two children.

Cooking career 
She was owner and founder of Marta's Kitchen, a boutique Dubai catering company and Marta's Workshop, a culinary atelier restaurant. Marta Yanci started her career in Law but shifted to the culinary world shortly after moving to Dubai.

Less than one year after opening, Marta's Workshop won the Hidden Gem award of Dubai's Restaurant Buzz Food Awards.

In 2013, Chef Marta was hired by Spain's Canal Cocina food channel to produce a dedicated cooking show. Season 1 of the series, entitled "Recipes for Under 5 euros" brought 22 chapter adapted Chef Marta's creations adapted to constrained budgets.

Following the success of the first season, Chef Marta returned to Canal Cocina to launch the second season of her show. Due to the success of her show and her business in Dubai, Marta's story received a wide coverage across Spanish media

In 2011, she won the Dubai's Best Amateur Cook competition of the Studio One show of Dubai One TV, judged by Chef Sameer Miglani of the Movenpick Hotel in Bur Dubai. After this award, Marta founded Marta's Kitchen, offering private chef services at first and growing the business to larger capacities later on.

Through Marta's Kitchen, Marta Yanci has developed initiatives to use cooking and the culinary arts as a channel to bring people together and learn about food.

Marta is an advocate of women's health issues and a regular contributor to Dubai's food magazines and online portals. Her cooking philosophy is to maximize taste and texture.

Acting career
Since 2021 she has participated in the TV series Bosé as Miguel Bosé's sister, Lucía Dominiguín. She also appeared in shows such as "Amar Es Para Siempre" and Quarantine Leap. She is also scheduled to appear in the upcoming show Cimarrón.

As a voiceover artist, Marta has dubbed major brands such as Google or Amazon in both English and Spanish.

References

External links

21st-century Spanish actresses
Living people
Spanish chefs
People from San Sebastián
Year of birth missing (living people)
Spanish women chefs